Eduardo Cuevas (born 20 June 1951) is a Chilean former cyclist. He competed in the individual pursuit and team pursuit events at the 1984 Summer Olympics.

References

External links
 

1951 births
Living people
Chilean male cyclists
Olympic cyclists of Chile
Cyclists at the 1984 Summer Olympics
Place of birth missing (living people)